Nasi campur (Indonesian for 'mixed rice'), also known as nasi rames or sega campur in Java, refers to an Indonesian dish of a scoop of nasi putih (white rice) accompanied by small portions of a number of other dishes, which includes meats, vegetables, peanuts, eggs, and fried-shrimp krupuk. Depending on origin, a nasi campur vendor might serve several side dishes, including vegetables, fish, and meats. It is a staple meal from Indonesia and popular in Malaysia, Singapore, Brunei, and southern Thailand, and also the Netherlands through its colonial ties with Indonesia. A similar form called chanpurū exists in Okinawa.

Origin and variations
Nasi campur is a ubiquitous dish around Indonesia and as diverse as the Indonesian archipelago itself, with regional variations. There is no exact rule, recipe, or definition of what makes a nasi campur, since Indonesians and by large Southeast Asians commonly consume steamed rice surrounded with side dishes consisting of vegetables and meat. As a result, the question of origin or recipe is obscure. Yet nasi campur is commonly perceived as steamed rice surrounded with dishes that might consists of vegetables and meats, served in personal portions, in contrast to tumpeng that is served in larger collective portions or rijsttafel that was presented in lavish colonial banquets.

There are several local variations throughout Southeast Asia: from Java, Bali, the Malay Peninsula, Borneo, Sulawesi, and Indo colonial to Chinese Indonesian versions of nasi campur. A similar Minangkabau counterpart is called nasi Padang and prominent especially in Sumatra region.

Balinese

In Bali, the mixed rice called nasi campur Bali or simply nasi Bali is a favorite among tourists. This Balinese version of nasi campur probably is the most internationally well-known version, mostly due to the "Bali factor", the Balinese popularity as the island resort among international visitors. The tastes are often distinctly local, punctuated by basa genep (lit. complete spices), the typical Balinese spice mix used as the base for many curry and vegetable dishes. The Balinese version of mixed rice may have grilled tuna, fried tofu, cucumber, spinach, tempe, beef cubes, vegetable curry, corn, chili sauce on the bed of rice. Mixed rice is often sold by street vendors, wrapped in a banana leaf.

As a Hindu majority island, the Balinese version might add lawar and babi guling in their nasi campur fares. Nevertheless, the halal version is available, with ayam betutu, sate lilit, and eggs to accompany the rice.

Javanese
In Java, nasi campur is often called nasi rames, and wide variations are available across the island. One dish that usually found in a Javanese nasi campur is fried noodle. The combination known as nasi rames is a dish created in West Java during World War II by the Indo (Eurasian) cook Truus van der Capellen, who ran the Bandung soup kitchens during (and after) the Japanese occupation. Later she opened a restaurant in the Netherlands and made the dish equally popular there.

In Yogyakarta a Javanese version of nasi campur is called nasi ingkung, which consist of a whole cooked chicken dish called ayam ingkung, urapan kasultan, perkedel, empal gapit, sate tusuk jiwo, and tumpeng rice.

Indonesian Chinese

Some people who reside in Jakarta and other major cities with significant Chinese population area use the term nasi campur loosely to refer to Chinese Indonesian's nasi campur Tionghoa (i.e., Chinese-styled nasi campur), a dish of rice with an assortment of barbecued meats, such as char siew, crispy roast pork, sweet pork sausage, and pork satay. This dish is usually served with simple Chinese chicken soup or sayur asin, an Indonesian clear broth of pork bones with fermented mustard greens. However, a name for a similar dish does not exist in mainland China, Singapore, Malaysia, or even most other areas of Indonesia outside of Jakarta.

Nasi campur today
The name nasi campur Tionghoa is only a shortened version of "nasi dengan daging campur cara Tionghoa" (i.e. "rice with assortment of Chinese-styled meats"). Furthermore, most Chinese vendors and food-court stalls in the region serve only one kind of meat with rice and a bowl of broth; patrons have to order different meats as separate dishes or add-ons. Hence, in most cases, those Chinese vendors' menu refers to the specific meat accompanying plain rice, for example char siew rice or roast pork rice. The nasi campur Tionghoa in this respect, is the combo set menu of various Chinese barbecued meats.

In most cases, nasi campur refers specifically to the Indonesian and Malaysian versions of rice with assortments of side dishes. In Indonesia, it refers to any kind of rice surrounded by various dishes. In Malaysia, it refers more specifically to Malay mixed rice. In Japan, United States, and most foreign countries, nasi campur often refers to the Balinese version, while in the Netherlands it most often refers to Indo-colonial nasi rames. The side dishes themselves might vary widely among regions and eating establishments.

Gallery

See also

 List of rice dishes
 List of steamed foods
 Economy rice
 Nasi Kapau
 Nasi bogana
 Nasi goreng
 Nasi kucing
 Nasi kuning
 Nasi lemak
 Nasi pecel
 Nasi uduk
 Nasi ulam
 Rijsttafel

References

External links
 

Indonesian rice dishes
Steamed foods